Guhr or Gühr is a German language surname. It stems from a reduced form of the male given name Gregory – and may refer to:
Carl Guhr (1787–1848), German violinist
Christin Gühr (1982), German female volleyball player
Richard Guhr (1873–1956), German sculptor and painter

References 

German-language surnames
Surnames from given names